Yoon Je-kyun (born 1969) is a South Korean film director . His debut My Boss, My Hero is about a gangster who is sent back to school, while Sex Is Zero has been compared with American Pie.

However, his disaster movie Haeundae (2009), which has been billed as South Korea's first disaster film, had a $16 million budget,  and was nominated for several awards—including Best Film and Best Director—at the 2009 Black Dragon Awards; the film won the award for Best Special Effects.

In July 2022, Yoon became the president and CEO of CJ ENM Studios, the newly-launched production subsidiary of CJ ENM.

Filmography 
 My Boss, My Hero (2001)
 Can't Live Without Robbery  Steal It If You Can or Thief Maker (2002)
 Sex Is Zero (2002)
 Romantic Warriors a.k.a. Crazy Assassins (2003)
 Miracle on 1st Street (2007)
 Sex Is Zero 2 (2007) - Producer
 Haeundae  Tidal Wave (2009)
 Sector 7 (2011) - Producer
 Ode to My Father (2014)
 Confidential Assignment (2017) - Producer
 The Negotiation (2018) - Producer
 Pawn (2020) - Producer
 Hero (2022)
 Kung Fu Robot (TBA)

Awards 
2009 18th Buil Film Awards: Best Director (Haeundae)
2015 10th APN Awards: Recipient
2015 52nd Grand Bell Awards: Best Director (Ode to My Father)

References

External links 
 
 

1969 births
Living people
South Korean film directors
Korea University alumni
People from Busan
Grand Prize Paeksang Arts Award (Film) winners